The Women's 800 metre freestyle event at the 2013 Southeast Asian Games took place on 14 December 2013 at Wunna Theikdi Aquatics Centre.

There were 12 competitors from 6 countries who took part in this event. 8 swimmers with the fast qualifying time were in the fast heat, the others were in the slow heat. The final ranking was arranged by the times from both heats.

Schedule
All times are Myanmar Standard Time (UTC+06:30)

Records

Results

References

External links

Swimming at the 2013 Southeast Asian Games
2013 in women's swimming